Geminin coiled-coil domain-containing protein 1 (GEMC1) is a Geminin family chromatin-binding protein encoded by the GMNC gene located on Chromosome 3 band 3q28. It is involved in the cell cycle, initiation of DNA replication, cilium assembly, and cell population proliferation. Reduced Generation of Multiple Motile Cilia (RGMC) is a rare ciliopathy characterized by hydrocephalus, the buildup of mucus in the airways, and reduced fertility that can be linked to defective multiple ciliated cell (MCC) differentiation, a process in which GEMC1, MCIDAS (another Geminin family protein), and CCNO are crucial.

Role in DNA replication 
GEMC1 promotes the initiation of chromosomal DNA replication by mediating TOPBP1- and CDK2-dependent recruitment of CDC45L onto replication origins.

Role in Ciliogenesis 
GEMC1 and MCIDAS transcriptionally activate E2F4/5-target genes during multiciliogenesis, including CCNO, which is necessary for the generation of multiple motile cilia.

Respiratory tract 
The airways are lined by MCCs that generate the flow of mucus by beating in a coordinated manner. The downregulation of numerous genes by the Mir449/34 family of miRNAs followed by the activation of a transcriptional program by Geminin family members GEMC1 and MCIDAS is required for the generation of airway MCCs in fish, frogs and mammals.

Fertility 
Male and female infertility has been observed in mice mutant for GEMC1, MCIDAS, or CCNO due to defective MCC differentiation. In females, MCC loss in the oviducts is the probable cause of infertility. The efferent duct epithelia of males contains MCCs that mobilize luminal fluids to prevent the agglutination of spermatozoa and promote fluid reabsorption. In mice mutant for these genes, degeneration of Sertoli cells, thinning of the seminiferous tubule epithelia, dilation of the rete testes and seminiferous tubules, sperm agglutinations in the efferent ducts, and lack of spermatozoa in the epididymis has been observed in conjunction with defects in MCC development.

References 

Proteins